Przystałowice Małe  is a village in the administrative district of Gmina Rusinów, within Przysucha County, Masovian Voivodeship, in east-central Poland.

The village has a population of 310.

References

Villages in Przysucha County